Rhodes State College, formally James A. Rhodes State College, is a public community college in Lima, Ohio. It offers associate degrees and shares a campus with the Ohio State University at Lima. High school students comprise over 50% of those enrolled at Rhodes State College.

History

Rhodes State College, previously Lima Technical College, was founded in 1971 in Lima, OH.  This institution was based primarily on technical training of students who lived in Allen County, OH.  Over five hundred students enrolled during the first year.  By the mid 1990s, Lima Technical College offered over seventy Associate and other certificate degree programs.

In 2002, Lima Technical College changed its name to James A. Rhodes State College in order to honor the former governor.  Rhodes played a major role in developing Ohio's two-year colleges. It is now referred to as Rhodes State College.

References

External links 
Official website

Lima, Ohio
Public universities and colleges in Ohio
Education in Allen County, Ohio
Buildings and structures in Lima, Ohio
Community colleges in Ohio